Dreams or  is a 1993 Russian fantastical absurdist comedy directed by Karen Shakhnazarov and Alexander Borodyansky.

Plot
...Russia, end of the 19th century. Countess Prizorova suffers from strange dreams. In them the Countess becomes a dishwasher by the name of Masha Stepanova who works in a dirty Moscow eatery in 1993.

...Masha Stepanova has a pensioner husband, who shoots her nude and then sells these photos on the Arbat. Soon the president of Russia approaches Masha for help. An IMF representative is coming to Moscow and Stepanova who is appointed as Minister of Finance must seduce the foreigner to obtain favorable loans for Russia. However the provocation with Masha fails because of lustful Semyon Borisovich, accountant of the canteen where Stepanova works.

Count Prizorov, alarmed by his wife's condition, refers first to a famous doctor, and then, well, to a medium Monsieur Renoir. After the "magical" psychic session Prizorov explains that his wife has a prophetic gift: she dreams about what would happen in Russia a hundred years. The future of the country seems terrible: poverty, a general collapse, violence of criminals, foreign prostitutes, lack of spirituality... The shocked Count decides to take a desperate step: at the time of the report to the Emperor Nicholas II, Prizorov requires to immediately begin implementation of economic and social reforms because the current rate of the tsarist government will inevitably lead to revolution. Alas, the emperor and his entourage remain deaf to Prizorov's fiery speech, the Count is discharged and the course of history does not change...

Cast
 Amaliya Mordvinova – Countess Prizorova / Maria Ivanovna Stepanova
 Oleg Basilashvili – Count Dmitry Prizorov
 Armen Dzhigarkhanyan – Doctor
 Arnold Ides – Semyon Borisovich, accountant of the dining room / Lieutenant general  Ivan Ivanovich Rastorguev
 Pyotr Merkurev – Monsieur Renoir, medium
 Valery Nosik – Minister of Culture of Russia
 Aleksei Zharkov – Klotchkov, Colonel general and Deputy Minister of Defense of Russia
 Yuriy Sherstnyov – Ivan Kurochkin, Minister of Agriculture of Russia Doctor
 Andrei Rostotsky – Nicholas II of Russia
 Andrei Vertogradov – President of Russia
 Fred Hiatt – Dominique, baron and the representative of IMF 
 Aleksandr Chislov – Oleg, member of the government of Russia
 Gennady Sharapov – bearded member of the government of Russia
 Victor Pomortsev – Edward, member of the government of Russia
 Gosha Kutsenko – Shtokman,  tailor (uncredited)
 Ekaterina Obraztsova – Major Panteleyeva, head of security of country residences 
 Marina Openkina – Paracha, Countess Prizorova's maid
 Aleksandr Loye – boy buying nudes

See also 
 Buddha's Little Finger (film)

References

External links

1990s historical comedy films
1993 films
Russian historical comedy films
Films directed by Karen Shakhnazarov